The Fleur-de-lis Trail is a scenic roadway located on Nova Scotia's Cape Breton Island.

Routes
Trunk 4
Trunk 22 
Route 206
Route 247
Route 320
Route 327
Trout Brook Road
Fourchu Road
St. Peters Fourchu Road

Communities
 Port Hawkesbury
 Arichat
 Isle Madame
 D'Escousse
 Lennox Passage
 Grandique Ferry
 Louisdale
 Grande Anse
 L'Ardoise
 St. Peters
 Lower St. Esprit
 Fourchu
 Gabarus Lake
 Marion Bridge 
 Trout Brook
 Albert Bridge
 Catalone
 Louisbourg

Parks
Two Rivers Wildlife Park
Mira River Provincial Park
Lennox Passage Provincial Park
Burnt Island Provincial Park
Point Michaud Beach Provincial Park
Battery Prov. Park
St. Peters Canal National Historic Site
Pondville Beach Provincial Park
The Fortress of Louisbourg National Historic Site

References

External links
 Fleur-de-lis Trail
 Fleur-de-lis Trail - Accommodations & Restaurants

Roads in Richmond County, Nova Scotia
Roads in the Cape Breton Regional Municipality
Scenic travelways in Nova Scotia